Terence Patrick Barwick (born 11 January 1983) is an English football manager and former professional footballer.

As a player he was a midfielder who played between 2000 and 2020. He played as a professional in the Football League for Scunthorpe United and Grimsby Town, before going on to play in non-League football for York City, Northwich Victoria, Stalybridge Celtic, Retford United, Droylsden, Worksop Town, Frickley Athletic, Bottesford Town and most notably Goole where he spent four spells at between 2009 and 2020. In 2018 he was appointed joint manager at Goole, a position which he resigned from fourteen months later.

Playing career

Scunthorpe United
Sheffield born Barwick came through the youth ranks of Scunthorpe United and was added to the first team squad in the final months of the 1999–2000 campaign. He made his debut in the club's 2–1 league defeat against Burnley when he came on as 46th-minute substitute for Justin Walker. Though he only played a cameo role in his five years at the Glanford Park, he was highly thought of by the club's supporters. He learned the ropes under first team manager Brian Laws and his assistant Russ Wilcox. Barwick was bred from the same youth side that featured Matthew Sparrow and Andy Butler and like the pair and other players who come through United's youth ranks, he did well enough to keep himself at the club for a reasonable period. His performances earned him a new one-year contract in both May 2003 and again in 2004. Barwick was to only make the single appearance for the club in the 2004–05 promotion winning campaign and at the end of the season he was deemed surplus to requirements and was released by the club.

Grimsby Town
Following his release from Scunthorpe, Russell Slade made him one of the first new names to sign for Grimsby Town in preparation for the 2005–06 season. Despite joining The Mariners on a two-year deal and having arrived with praise from his former management staff at Scunthorpe, Barwick struggled to find his feet at Blundell Park and found himself looked over in favour of players such as Paul Bolland, Ciaran Toner and Jean-Paul Kamudimba Kalala. He did notably appear for The Mariners in their 1–0 League Cup victory over Tottenham Hotspur. Barwick found it hard to settle at Grimsby and some fans had given him a tough time over the fact he was a former player of rival club Scunthorpe, and the fact his performances were average never helped his cause. This in turn allowed Slade to loan him too Conference National side York City in November 2005. where he made three appearances. Barwick returned to Grimsby in January 2006 but continued to struggle in terms of gaining any run in the first team. The Mariners started the 2006–07 season under different command, when Russell Slade left the club, and in stepped his assistant Graham Rodger. As far as first team chances went, there was no difference .It was clear from as early as pre-season that Barwick was not among the plans of the new manager and he was transfer listed. It wasn't long before he was allowed to leave the club, and his two-year contract was cancelled when he signed for Northwich Victoria a couple of weeks into the new season in August.

Non-League
He made a permanent move to the Conference when he joined Northwich Victoria in August 2006 and finished the 2006–07 season with 21 appearances. He was signed by former Northwich manager Steve Burr at Stalybridge Celtic in June. Barwick was released by Celtic after the conclusion of the 2008–09 season, and signed for Northern Premier League side Retford United. In December 2009, Barwick joined Goole A.F.C. and then moved onto Droylsden. In the summer of 2010 he moved back to Goole AFC.

In March 2011 he signed for Worksop Town, before moving back to Goole AFC for a third time in October 2011. In July 2012 he signed with Frickley Athletic. In the summer of 2013 he moved on to Bottesford Town. On 20 July 2017 he returned to Goole for a fourth time.

Managerial career
In December 2018 he was appointed joint manager of the club alongside Matty Bloor. The two resigned in February 2020.

Career statistics

Honours

Scunthorpe United
League Two promotion: 2004–05

References

External links

1983 births
Living people
Footballers from Sheffield
English footballers
Association football midfielders
Scunthorpe United F.C. players
Grimsby Town F.C. players
York City F.C. players
Northwich Victoria F.C. players
Stalybridge Celtic F.C. players
Retford United F.C. players
Goole A.F.C. players
Droylsden F.C. players
Worksop Town F.C. players
Frickley Athletic F.C. players
Bottesford Town F.C. players
English Football League players
National League (English football) players
Northern Premier League players
English football managers
Goole A.F.C. managers